Melbour (now called Melbourne) is an Argentine brand of cigarettes, which is currently manufactured by Espert S.A. Tabacalera, a local division of Imperial Tobacco. The cigarettes are made from Virginia, Burley and Stern type tobaccos.

Overview

The production of Melbour cigarettes began in 2002, the year of the inauguration of the first floor of the Tabacalera company, founded by Carlos Daniel Tomeo.

In 2015, Philip Morris USA filed a lawsuit against Espert S.A. because of the brand name Melbour due to its similar and thus, confusing name. The company however, demonstrated it had acquired de facto rights in the local market. In the end however, the company agreed to change the name of the brand from Melbour to Melbourne to clear up any further controversies.

Products
Melbour Full Flavor
Melbour Lights

See also
 Cigarette
 Tobacco smoking

References

External links
 

Imperial Brands brands